Evelyn Charles Donaldson Rawlins (1884–1971), Esquire, CMG, CBE was a British diplomat during the reign of King George VI. Rawlins was His Majesty's Envoy Extraordinary and Minister Plenipotentiary to the Republic of Bolivia on 4 November 1937.  He served until 1939.

References

20th-century British diplomats
Ambassadors of the United Kingdom to Bolivia
Companions of the Order of St Michael and St George
Commanders of the Order of the British Empire
1884 births
1971 deaths